Trần Gia Thu is a former Vietnamese cyclist. He competed in the individual and team road race events at the 1956 Summer Olympics.

References

External links
 

Year of birth missing (living people)
Living people
Vietnamese male cyclists
Olympic cyclists of Vietnam
Cyclists at the 1956 Summer Olympics
Place of birth missing (living people)
Asian Games medalists in cycling
Cyclists at the 1966 Asian Games
Medalists at the 1966 Asian Games
Asian Games bronze medalists for Vietnam